Honningbarna is a punk rock band from Kristiansand, Norway, known for performing lyrics in the local Kristiansand dialect.

Career 
The band débuted in 2010 with the EP Honningbarna. In January 2011, they were named as the winners in a competition for fresh music, Årets Urørt organized by the radio station NRK P3. The winning song named Borgerskapets utakknemlige sønner  ("Ungrateful sons of the bourgeoisie"). At 25th of march, in the same year, they released their debut album La alarmane gå (Sound the alarms). The debut album won in the category of rock during Spellemannprisen 2011. They were also nominated in the category Newcomer. In 2011 they played at a festival Øyafestivalen and live on NRK TV campaign of 2011.

Drummer Anders Eikås died in a car accident on 31 January 2012.

Band members 
Edvard Valberg (vocal, cello)
Christoffer Trædal (guitar)
Tomas Berglund (bass)
Johan Hansson Liljeberg (guitar)
Nils Nilsen (drums)

Past members 
Mathias Johansson (organ)
Anders Eikås (drums) (deceased)
Fredrik Justnes (guitar)
Lars Emmelthun (bass)
Simen Følstad Nilsen (guitar)

Honors 
2011: Spellemannprisen in the category Rock music, for the album La Alarmane Gå

Discography

Studio albums 
2011: La Alarmane Gå
2013: Verden Er Enkel
2015: Opp De Nye Blanke
2016: Goldenboy
2017: Voldelig Lyd
2022: Animorphs

EPs 
2010: Honningbarna (EP)

Singles 
2010: Våkn opp
2010: Noen å hate
2010: Til ungdommen
2011: Den eldre garde
2011: Protokoll
2011: God jul Jesus – Bootleg Series
2012: Offerdans
2013: Fuck Kunst (Dans Dans)
2013: Police on My Back
2015: Prinser av Sarajevo
2016: Drep meg
2017: Hold an ann
2017: Sant
2017: Penthouse Perfekt

In 2013 they also contributed to the book Think like a rockstar, written by Ståle Økland.

References

External links 
 
 Interview with Honningbarna (2012)
 

Norwegian punk rock groups
Spellemannprisen winners
Musical groups established in 2010
2010 establishments in Norway
Musical groups from Kristiansand